Disston may refer to:

People:
Hamilton Disston (1844–1896), American industrialist and real-estate developer
Henry Disston (1819–1878), English American industrialist who founded the Keystone Saw Works in 1840
Horace Disston (1906–1982), American field hockey player

Places:
Disston City, Gulfport, Florida, USA
Disston, Oregon, unincorporated community in Lane County, Oregon, United States
Disston Saw Works, manufacturer of handsaws in the United States

See also
Dison